Akogun Kamarudeen Olalere "Lere" Oyewumi (born 5 January 1960) is a Nigerian politician, educationist, philanthropist and community development specialist. He was chairman of Irewole Local Government on a platform of the People's Democratic Party (PDP) and a member of Nigerian House of Representatives in the third Republic. He is the former Commissioner in the National Population Commission, Abuja.

Early life
Oyewumi was born on January 5, 1960, to the family of Late Alhaji Rabiu Ewuola Oyewumi of Elere's Compound, Ikire, Osun State; and Alhaja Limota Arike Oyewumi.

Education
He was educated at the Baptist Day School, Odeyinka, Ikire; Saint Augustine's Commercial Modern school, Ikire where he obtained his modern III certificate in 1978 and Saint David's Grammar School, Ode-Omu. At Saint David's, Oyewumi displayed excellent leadership and academic traits. He was named the Senior Prefect and later came off in flying colour in the West African School Certificate Examination (WASCE). With his distinctive Grade 1 in the 1981's School Certificate Examination, Oyewumi was adjudged the Best Student in the whole of then Irewole Local Government (comprising the current day Irewole, Ayedaade and Isokan Local Governments). Upon the completion of his secondary education, he gained employment in the Old Oyo State Ministry of Works and Transport as a Clerical Officer. In 1983, Akogun was admitted to the prestigious University of Ife (now Obafemi Awolowo University, Ile-Ife) to study Geography and finally obtained a bachelor's degree Second Class Honours Upper Division in 1987. From 1987 to 1988, he had the statutory National Youth Service Corps (NYSC) programme in Benue State. Oyewumi later obtained a master's degree in community development in 2006, and a doctoral degree from the University of Ibadan in 2016.

Employment
After the mandatory NYSC in 1988, Oyewumi secured an employment as education officer in the Federal Ministry of Education and was seconded to the Federal Government Girl's College, New Bussa, Niger State. He was in the teaching profession until 1992, when he listened to the clarion call of his people to join politics of the Third Republic. In the private sector, Oyewumi worked as chairman and chief executive officer of an NNPC concessional petrol station. His experience in this regard gives him in-depth knowledge of all the streams of the petroleum industry in the country.

Politics
Oyewumi's flair for politics began during his undergraduate days at OAU, Ife when he was elected national vice president of National Association of Nigeria Geography Students. He was also, at various times, secretary and president of the National Association of Ikire Students(NAIS) both at OAU Chapter and National body. In 1992, some five years after he left university, Oyewumi contested and, through the massive votes of his people in Irewole/Ayedaade/Isokan Federal Constituency, won a seat in the House of Representatives, Abuja under the platform of the Social Democratic Party (SDP) whose presidential candidate was Bashorun MKO Abiola. He was a member of House Committee on Agriculture and Rural Development;and Chairman, Sub-Committee on National Agriculture Land Development Authority(NALDA).

The political instability of the period brought the Republic to an abrupt end. Subsequently, Akogun Oyewumi joined forces with other democrats to defend the country's fledgling democracy. On June 12, Oyewumi became chairman of the Yoruba socio-cultural group Afenifere in Irewole Local Government and; he, together with other politicians and lovers of democracy, galvanised and articulated the message of "June 12" in every nook and cranny of Osun State. He was vibrant and actively involved in the struggle to drive the military government of General Babangida and General Sani Abacha back to barracks.

At the return of civilian rule in 1999, Akogun was made the publicity secretary of the People's Democratic Party (PDP) in Osun State. In 2004, after having served as a caretaker chairman of Irewole Local Government for one year, he was elected substantive chairman and served in this capacity until 2011, when the government of Governor Rauf Aregbesola dissolved the local councils in the state. Oyewumi, because of his stern leadership quality and exemplary achievements as local government chairman, was made the chairman of Association of Local Governments of Nigeria (ALGON) in Osun State and vice president in the national executive.

Olalere in the February 25, 2023 general election, won as the senator represting the good people of Osun West.
Senator Lere Oyewumi of PDP won with 34,200 votes to defeat his close opponent in APC and he has now being declared by INEC on Sunday, February 26, 2023.

Family life
Akogun Lere Oyewumi is married to Yeye Omolara Oyewumi, and the marriage is blessed with 4 children.

Achievements
During his tenure as chairman of Irewole local government, Oyewumi constructed and rehabilitated Sunmoye-Obada road, Obada-Jolaiya-Sabo road, Itaakun-Popo road, Oke-Ola-Oluofinrin road, Iyana-Egba-Ayedaade road, Okiti Islamiya road, Itaakun-Molak junction. His government is reputed to have carried out general electrification of Irewole Local Government with concrete poles, cables and extensions. He also ensured 5 units of 500 KVA transformers were procured and installed to cater for the growing suburb population. The following areas benefitted from the gesture: Elere compound, Sunmoye Ikire, Oja Ale, Oke Ada, Anajere Oluofinrin and Islamia junction, which are all in Ikire. Oyewumi's government also constructed boreholes at Odeyinka, Olode Falola, Dede village and Akinropo. This particular performance of Oyewumi's government motivated RUWESA in conjunction with UNICEF in 2010 to provide additional 250 units of boreholes to the local government.

In addition, over 200 units of public taps, that spread across the length and breadth of Irewole Local Government were constructed.

Honours
Oyewumi was honoured the Best Chairman in the South West by International Trade and Services, South Africa. He was also awarded the Best Nigerian Local Government Chairman in the Provision of Infrastructural Facilities by Grassroots Development Survey, Abuja. Oyewumi holds the traditional titles of Akogun of Awoland, Apesin of Ikireland, Fiwajoye of Ola, Aare Atunluse of Erin-sun, Jagun–Osiri of Imesi-ile, Jagunmolu of Ilie, Bobajiro of the Ora Kingdom and Atayese of the Ikoyi Kingdom, Atunluse of Ila Kingdom.

References

External links 
 The Punch [Lagos]. 14 November 2008. Tunde Odesola. "Why Akire's Palace Was Burnt – LG Boss
 This Day [Lagos]. 18 November 2008. Yinka Kolawole. ", Nigeria: Osun Rulers Tasked On Community Mobilisation (AllAfrica)

1960 births
Living people
Nigerian civil servants
Nigerian chief executives
Obafemi Awolowo University alumni
University of Ibadan alumni
Peoples Democratic Party members of the House of Representatives (Nigeria)